Long Tebangan is a longhouse settlement in the interior of the Marudi division of Sarawak, Malaysia, on the upper Baram River.

The Malaysian government announced on 27 January 2007 that Long Tebangan was Kampung Gerakan Daya Wawasan (The Vision Village). However, if the Baram Dam hydroelectric project goes ahead, Long Tebangan will be one of the villages affected by the flooding of 389,000 hectares of jungle.

Neighbouring settlements include:

References

Villages in Sarawak